Simon Milward (born Strete, Devon, UK 28 January 1965, died Mali 4 March 2005) was the General Secretary of the Federation of European Motorcyclists Associations (FEMA), based in Brussels, Belgium from 1992 to 1999. He represented motorcyclists in the institutions of the European Union concerning road safety and consumer issues.

A collision with a car resulted in hospitalisation. Whilst there, he decided to ride a motorcycle around the world during the course of which he would raise funds for international medical aid. This was called the Millennium Ride and started in 2000.

In May 2002, Milward helped to establish a pilot project entitled Health for All, based on the Riders for Health zero breakdown principles, on the remote Indonesian island of Flores. This is now funded by the charity Motorcycle Outreach.

Simon continued his journey through Latin America and then through Africa, travelling north from South Africa.

Milward lost his life in a road accident in Mali on 4 March 2005. He was cremated in his home town of Exeter in South-West England.

References
 Millennium Ride
 Motorcycle Outreach
 Riders

People from Exeter
1965 births
2005 deaths
Long-distance motorcycle riders